The Black League was a heavy metal band from Finland. They were formed in 1998 by Taneli Jarva, three years after his departure from Finnish metal band Sentenced. The Black League's first two full-lengths carry on the spirit from Taneli's work with his former band, seasoning their metal with elements of traditional rock 'n' roll. On their third release, Man's Ruin Revisited, these influences take an even more prominent role in their sound. In October 2014, Taneli Jarva pronounced of his decision to call the band the quits due to "lack of personal inspiration".

Band members 
 Taneli Jarva – lead vocals (1998–2014)
 Maike Valanne – rhythm guitar, backing vocals (1998–2014)
 Heavy Hiltunen – lead guitar (2005–2014)
 Ilkka Tanska – bass (2005–2014)
 Rale Tiiainen – drums (2005–2014)

Previous members 
 Alexi Ranta – lead guitar (1998–2005)
 Mikko Laurila (a.k.a. Florida) – bass (1998–2005)
 Kimmo Luttinen (a.k.a. Sir Luttinen) – drums (1998–2005)

Session members 
 Lene Leinonen – bass (live 2004)

Discography

Demos 
Demo 98 (1998)

Singles 
Cold Women & Warm Beer (2003)

EPs 
Doomsday Sun (2001)

Albums 
 Ichor (2000)
 Utopia A.D. (2001)
 Man's Ruin Revisited (2004)
 A Place Called Bad (2005)
 Ghost Brothel (2009)

Videography 
 Winter Winds Sing (2000)
 Rex Talionis (2002)
 Same Ol' Fuckery (2005)
 The Pusher (2007)
 The Beast Is a Riddle (2009)

References 

1998 establishments in Finland
Finnish heavy metal musical groups
Musical groups established in 1998
Musical quintets